Chandmani (jewel, ; also Chandman) signifies:

 the Mongolian term for Cintamani, a Buddhist symbol
 Chandmani Uul, a mountain in Mongolia
 Chandmani Uul Aimag, a historical Aimag (province) of Mongolia
 several Sums (districts) in different Aimags of Mongolia:
 Chandmani, Govi-Altai
 Chandmani, Khovd
 Chandmani-Öndör, Khövsgöl
 Bayanchandmani, Töv